Geirsson is a surname. Notable people with the name include:

Elmar Geirsson (born 1948), Icelandic footballer
Hafsteinn Geirsson (born 1980), Icelandic sailor
Logi Geirsson (born 1982), Icelandic handballer
Lúðvík Geirsson (born 1959), Icelandic politician
Marteinn Geirsson (born 1951), Icelandic footballers

Icelandic-language surnames